Chandler is a city in Henderson County, Texas, United States, at the northern end of Lake Palestine. Its population was 3,275 at the 2020 census, up from 2,734 at the 2010 census.

Geography

Chandler is located in the northeast corner of Henderson County at  (32.307206, –95.479340). Texas State Highway 31 runs through the center of Chandler, leading east  to Tyler and southwest  to Athens, the Henderson County seat.

The city sits on high ground between the northern ends of two arms of Lake Palestine: Kickapoo Creek to the west and the Neches River to the east.

Demographics

As of the 2020 United States census, there were 3,275 people, 1,174 households, and 811 families residing in the city.

As of the census of 2000,  2,099 people, 817 households, and 588 families were residing in the city. The population density was 598.9 people/sq mi (231.6/km2). The 877 housing units averaged 250.2/sq mi (96.7/km2). The racial makeup of the city was 84.18% White, 13.15% African American, 0.29% Native American, 0.76% Asian, 0.29% from other races, and 1.33% from two or more races. Hispanics or Latinos of any race were 0.81% of the population.

Of the 817 households, 31.7% had children under 18 living with them, 56.9% were married couples living together, 12.4% had a female householder with no husband present, and 28.0% were not families. About 25.3% of all households were made up of individuals, and 13.8% had someone living alone who was 65 or older. The average household size was 2.47, and the average family size was 2.96.

In the city, the age distribution was  24.4% under 18, 6.1% from 18 to 24, 28.2% from 25 to 44, 21.2% from 45 to 64, and 20.2% who were 65 or older. The median age was 39 years. For every 100 females, there were 84.1 males. For every 100 females age 18 and over, there were 78.9 males.

The median income for a household in the city was $38,641, and for a family was $50,000. Males had a median income of $36,125 versus $26,615 for females. The per capita income for the city was $19,075. About 8.2% of families and 9.8% of the population were below the poverty line, including 9.7% of those under age 18 and 11.0% of those age 65 or over.

Public amenities

The city has three public parks:  Winchester Park is located on FM 315 South. It boasts five baseball fields, a playground, soccer fields, two pavilions, two concession areas, a lake, and a walking trail.  McCain Park, located on Hwy 31 West, is home to the Chandler Historical Museums.  This includes the historic Yarborough House and original train depot.  River Park, located on Hwy 31 East, provides great opportunities for boating, fishing, and birdwatching on the Neches River.

University of Texas ET Medical Center operates an outpatient treatment/fitness center near the central part of Chandler, and Christus Mother Frances also has a clinic in Chandler. Free Wi-Fi is available at the Chandler Public Library.

Education
Chandler is served by the Brownsboro Independent School District. Two public school campuses are located in the city: Chandler Elementary School and Chandler Intermediate School.

Notable people

 Ralph Yarborough, U.S. senator, was born in Chandler

See also

 List of cities in Texas

References

External links

 

Cities in Texas
Cities in Henderson County, Texas